Aliaksandr Tryputs (born 21 May 1982, in Grodno) is a wheelchair athlete from Belarus who specializes in throwing events and pentathlon.

Career 

Tryputs took up athletics in 1994 in Grodno.

He competed at the 2000, 2004, 2008 and 2016 Paralympics and won four medals: a gold, a silver and a bronze in the javelin throw (2004, 2000 and 2016, respectively) and a silver in the pentathlon in 2004. He placed fourth in the pentathlon in 2000 and fifth in the javelin in 2008. He served as the flag bearer for Belarus at the 2016 Summer Paralympics Parade of Nations.

References

Paralympic athletes of Belarus
Athletes (track and field) at the 2000 Summer Paralympics
Athletes (track and field) at the 2004 Summer Paralympics
Athletes (track and field) at the 2008 Summer Paralympics
Athletes (track and field) at the 2016 Summer Paralympics
Paralympic gold medalists for Belarus
Paralympic silver medalists for Belarus
Paralympic bronze medalists for Belarus
Living people
1982 births
Medalists at the 2000 Summer Paralympics
Medalists at the 2004 Summer Paralympics
Medalists at the 2016 Summer Paralympics
Belarusian male javelin throwers
Paralympic medalists in athletics (track and field)
Paralympic javelin throwers